This is a list of artists retrospectively classified under the genre sophisti-pop. The term has been applied to pop music that emerged during the mid-1980s in the UK which incorporated elements of new wave, jazz, soul, and pop. Music so classified often made extensive use of electronic keyboards, synthesizers and polished arrangements, particularly horn sections.

Sophisti-pop artists

References

 
Sophisti-pop